Leonard Michael Anthony "Len"/"Lenny The Lion" Killeen (19 November 1938 – 31 October 2011) was a South African basketball player, rugby union and  rugby league footballer who played in the 1960s and 1970s.

Killeen was born in Port Elizabeth, Eastern Cape, and played rugby union for Uitenhage RFC (in Uitenhage). A goal-kicking , he played rugby league in England for St. Helens, with whom he won the Challenge Cup in 1966. Killeen also played in Australia for the Balmain, winning the NSWRFL premiership with them in 1969 and becoming the club's all-time top point-scorer.

Playing career

Championship final appearances
Len Killeen played , i.e. number 5, and scored 3-tries and 6-conversions in St. Helens' 35–12 victory over Halifax in the Championship Final during the 1965–66 season at Station Road, Swinton on Saturday 28 May 1966, in front of a crowd of 30,165.

Challenge Cup Final appearances
Len Killeen played , i.e. number 5, scored a try and 5-conversions, and was man of the match winning the Lance Todd Trophy in St. Helens' 21–2 victory over Wigan in the 1966 Challenge Cup Final during the 1965–66 season at Wembley Stadium, London on Saturday 21 May 1966, in front of a crowd of 98,536.

County Cup Final appearances
Len Killeen played , i.e. number 2, and scored a try in St. Helens' 15–4 victory over Leigh in the 1963 Lancashire County Cup Final during the 1963–64 season at Station Road, Swinton on Saturday 26 October 1963, and played , i.e. number 5, and scored 3-conversions in the 12–4 victory over Swinton in the 1964 Lancashire County Cup Final during the 1964–65 season at Central Park, Wigan on Saturday 24 October 1964.

BBC2 Floodlit Trophy Final appearances
Len Killeen played , i.e. number 5, in St. Helens' 0–4 defeat by Castleford in the 1965 BBC2 Floodlit Trophy Final during the 1965–66 season at Knowsley Road, St. Helens on Tuesday 14 December 1965.

References

External links
Len Killeen bio at Saints Heritage Society
Spiking The Side-kick Issue - Sports Illustrated, 10 April 1967 (archived)
Two legends make Saints debuts
Cup heroes: Alex Murphy BBC SPORT, 27 February 2004
Len Killen at Rugby League Tables (archived)

1938 births
2011 deaths
Balmain Tigers players
Expatriate rugby league players in Australia
Expatriate rugby league players in England
Footballers who switched code
Lance Todd Trophy winners
Penrith Panthers players
Sportspeople from Port Elizabeth
Rugby league players from Eastern Cape
Rugby league wingers
Rugby union players from Port Elizabeth
South African expatriate rugby league players
South African expatriate sportspeople in Australia
South African expatriate sportspeople in England
South African rugby league players
South African rugby union players
St Helens R.F.C. players